"Ready or Not Here I Come (Can't Hide from Love)" is a single from American R&B vocal group The Delfonics. The song was produced by Thom Bell and released on October 22, 1968 by Philly Groove Records. The song peaked at number 35 on the U.S. pop chart, and number 14 on the U.S. R&B chart. Overseas, the song peaked at number 41 in the UK.

The song has been sampled and interpolated in numerous songs, including "Ready or Not" by The Fugees and "Ready or Not" by Bridgit Mendler.

Cover and samples versions 
 The song was covered by The Jackson 5 on their 1970 album, Third Album.
 The song was covered in 1973 by Johnny Osbourne in the album Big Shot.
 In 1996, the interpolation was used by The Fugees in their single "Ready or Not".  The song was a top 10 hit in many European countries, including a No. 1 in the UK.
 In 1997, the song was also sampled by Missy Elliott in her song "Sock It 2 Me".
 In 1998, the song was sampled by Dr.Dre in his song, "Forgot About Dre", featuring Eminem 
 In 2000, the song was sampled on "Who Run It" by Three 6 Mafia from their album, When the Smoke Clears: Sixty 6, Sixty 1.
 In 2004, T.I. sampled the song in "Get Loose," featuring Nelly.
 In 2008, the song was sampled by Bliss n Eso in their song "The Sea is Rising".
 In 2012, the interpolation was used by Bridgit Mendler for her song "Ready or Not".
 In 2012, the interpolation was also used by Britt Nicole for her song "Ready or Not" featuring Lecrae.
 In 2013, the song was sampled by George Watsky in his song "Moral of the Story".
 In 2013, the song was used in the video game Grand Theft Auto V on the fictional radio station The Lowdown 91.1.
 In 2014, the song was sampled by Lil' Kim in the chorus of her song "Whenever You See Me" from her mixtape Hardcore 2K14.
 In 2015, the song was covered by Scala & Kolacny Brothers for the live action trailer for the video game Evolve.
 In 2016, the song was covered by Laura Mvula.

Charts

References

External links
 Official Delfonics

1968 singles
The Delfonics songs
The Jackson 5 songs
Songs written by Thom Bell
Songs written by William Hart (singer)
1968 songs
Laura Mvula songs
Philly Groove Records singles